Akbar Ali can refer to:

 Akbar Ali (cricketer) (born 2001), Bangladesh cricketer
 Akbar Ali (poet) (1925–2016), Indian poet
 Akbar Ali (umpire) (born 1973), Emirati cricket umpire